R-16 regional road (previously known as R-14 regional road) is a Montenegrin roadway.

It serves as an alternative connection between Plužine and Žabljak.

History

In January 2016, the Ministry of Transport and Maritime Affairs published bylaw on categorisation of state roads. With new categorisation, R-14 regional road was renamed as R-16 regional road.

Major intersections

References

R-16